Nematolepis rhytidophylla, is a dense shrub with angular stems, covered densely in coppery coloured scales, smooth, glossy leaves and  white flowers in small clusters in winter and spring.  It is endemic to New South Wales.

Description

The triangular shaped sepals are more or less fused at the base, mostly smooth, white and dotted with glands. Flowering occurs in spring and summer.

Taxonomy
This species was first formally described in 1998 by David Albrecht and Neville Walsh and named it Phebalium rhytidophyllum, and the description was published in the journal Muelleria. In 1998 Paul G.Wilson changed the name to Nematolepis rhytidophylla and the change published in Nuytsia.

Distribution and habitat
Nematolepis rhytidophylla is an understorey shrub with a restricted distribution, found growing on the ranges between Wog Wog and White Rock Mountains southeast of Bombala growing in rocky, sclerophyll scrubland.

Conservation status
Nematolepis rhytidophylla is considered "vulnerable" under the Environment Protection and Biodiversity Conservation Act 1999.

References

Flora of New South Wales
rhytidophylla
Taxa named by Paul G. Wilson